Andasta siltte is a species of ray spider that is endemic to the Seychelles. It is only known from a single specimen from Silhouette Island. It is found in woodlands at the lower edge of cloud forest. It is threatened by habitat deterioration, from invasive plants (especially Cinnamomum verum) and climate change.

References

Theridiosomatidae
Critically endangered animals
Endemic fauna of Seychelles
Spiders described in 1996
Spiders of Africa